Grand Prairie is a swamp in the U.S. state of Georgia.

Grand Prairie was so named on account of a fanciful resemblance to Western prairies.

References

Swamps of Georgia (U.S. state)
Bodies of water of Ware County, Georgia